Qal'at Murair (also Qal'at Im Murair) is a ruined and deserted fortified castle located a mile and a half to the south eastern part of the town of Zubarah.

History
Qal'at Murair was built by the Al Bin Ali , main and principal Utub tribe  after their arrival to Zubarah from Kuwait. It was built in attempt to thwart off challenges by the Al Musallam branch of the Bani Khalid, who ruled over most of Qatar. They initiated the 1783 Utub invasion of Bahrain from the fort.

Description of the fort 
This castle was built 1500 meters outside the town of Zubarah with a channel and four walls lying between the town and the fort as well as a cemetery some 2100 meters outside the town. It was a fortified unit to oversee and protect the town from any invaders. Inside the fort was a masjid known as Murair Masjid as well a well  two fathoms deep, and outside the fort there are five wells one fathom deep, and all of its water is fresh.

See also
 Bani Utbah
 Zubarah

References

Al Shamal
Forts in Qatar
Disputed territories in the Persian Gulf

no:Al Zubarah